William Gustav Thon (February 27, 1886 – May 23, 1953) was an American politician and lawyer.

Biography
Thon was born in Clinton, Iowa. He received his law degree from Northwestern University Pritzker School of Law and was admitted to the Illinois bar in 1909. Thon practiced law in Chicago, Illinois. Thon served in the Illinois House of Representatives from 1915 to 1923; from 1925 to 1927; from 1929 to 1933; and then from 1939 until his death in 1953. He was a Republican. Thon died at his home in Chicago, Illinois from a brief illness.

References

External links

1886 births
1953 deaths
Politicians from Clinton, Iowa
Politicians from Chicago
Lawyers from Chicago
Northwestern University Pritzker School of Law alumni
Republican Party members of the Illinois House of Representatives
20th-century American politicians
20th-century American lawyers